Port Anne is a settlement in Newfoundland and Labrador.

Ghost towns in Newfoundland and Labrador

Port Anne was located on Burnt island and was once a settlement of approximately 125 people . As part of the Newfoundland Government resettlement program, residents mostly left Port Ann in the mid to late 1960’s.,